The Beriev A-40 Albatros (NATO reporting name: Mermaid) is a Soviet/Russian jet engine amphibious aircraft designed by the Beriev Aircraft Company for the anti-submarine warfare role. Intended as a replacement for the Beriev Be-12 amphibian and the land-based Ilyushin Il-38, the project was suspended after only one prototype had been manufactured, with the second one 70% completed, due to the breakup of the Soviet Union. The project was later revived as the A-42 and an order has been placed by the Russian Navy.

Development
The maiden flight in 1986 was unplanned; during a high-speed taxi test, the airplane became airborne and ran out of runway, with the crew being forced to continue the takeoff. The subsequent flight and landing went without further incident, but the test crew were downgraded from their duties afterwards, despite having saved the aircraft. 

By 1990 two variants were planned, with a search and rescue amphibian being designated the A-42, and a military patrol version designated as the A-44.  The A-42 and A-44 versions were combined in 1993, but work on amphibians came to a halt in that year with an A-42 prototype 80% completed.
 
In 2002, after renewed Russian Navy interest, the A-40 prototype was restored to airworthiness, and in 2006 the A-42 prototype was completed.  The Defense Ministry signed an R&D agreement for $242 million rubles but pulled the plug in 2011.    

On 3 September 2019, the Russian Navy announced an order for three A-42 aircraft, which would probably use two Progress D-27 propfans as the powerplant and have increased range to 9300 km.  This version would be upgraded to expand its combat capabilities, including a new radar comprising a viewing sight, heat seekers, piloting and navigational complex to measure sea waves, and new communications equipment.  An estimated service entry date was not provided, though.

Design

The A-40 is a jet-engined flying boat patrol bomber of all-metal construction with the engines located above the wing roots, atop each of the main landing gear nacelles at the rear of each wing root. The swept wings had a marked anhedral angle, with balance floats attached by short pylons directly under each wingtip.

Operational history
Between 1989 and 1998, the Beriev A-40 set 140 world records.

Variants
A-40 Initial ASW amphibian. 1 prototype built (second is 70% completed).

A-40M Projected upgrade to the initial version, utilising a new search and targeting system.

A-40P Initially a projected aerial firefighting version, able to scoop 25 tonnes (28 tons) of water and transport a team of firefighters. Later the same designation was used for a projected maritime patrol aircraft in direct competition with the Tupolev Tu-204P.

A-40PM/Be-40P A projected civil version developed in 1994. Intended to carry 105 passengers, an export version with CFM engines was also offered. These studies led to the development of the Beriev Be-200.

Be-40PT A projected cargo/passenger version designed to carry 70 passengers, 10 tonnes (11 tons) of cargo or 37 passengers and up to 6.5 tonnes of cargo.

A-42/Be-42 A Search and rescue version designed to replace the Beriev Be-12PS, in response to the K-278 disaster. Construction of a prototype began, but was suspended in 1993. Studies are currently being made of a joint A-42/44 multi-role version, fitted with Progress D-27 propfans.

A-44 Maritime patrol version designed in tandem with the A-42 before the projects were merged into a multi-role aircraft in 1993.

A-42PE Projected maritime patrol and SAR version intended for export. Powered by two Progress D-27 propfans.

Specifications (A-40)

See also

References

Bibliography

 Yefim Gordon, Andrey Sal'nikov and Aleksandr Zabotskiy (2006) Beriev's Jet Flying Boats. Hinckley, UK: Midland Publishing. 
 
 

A-40
Jet seaplanes and flying boats
1980s Soviet patrol aircraft
Amphibious aircraft
Engine-over-wing aircraft
Flying boats
High-wing aircraft
T-tail aircraft
Twinjets
Aircraft first flown in 1986